Tilman Valentin Schweiger (born 19 December 1963) is a German actor, voice actor and filmmaker. He runs his own production company, Barefoot Films, in Berlin.

Early life 
Schweiger was born in Freiburg, West Germany, to two teachers. He grew up in Heuchelheim near Giessen in Hesse, where he went to school. Later, he took acting lessons at Der Keller in Cologne and graduated in 1989.

Career 

Schweiger's debut as a producer and (uncredited) director came in 1997 with Knockin' on Heaven's Door. He also directed and produced Der Eisbär (The Polar Bear) in 1998. Schweiger won a Bambi Award for Barfuss (Barefoot) in 2005, which he wrote, directed, and starred in. He also won a Bambi for his lead role in Traumschiff Surprise – Periode 1. In 2007, Keinohrhasen (this literally translates to "no ear rabbit" while the English title is Rabbit Without Ears), written, produced, and directed by Schweiger, became the most successful film in German theaters with a box office result of USD 62,000,000. The film won a Bambi, a Bavarian Film Award, the German Comedy Award, two DIVA Awards, a Jupiter Award and the Ernst Lubitsch Award. The sequel, Zweiohrküken (Rabbit Without Ears 2, literally "two ear chicks"), was released the following year with over 4.2 million viewers and a box office collection of USD 45,000,000. Schweiger then went on to direct, produce and star in 1½ Knights – In Search of the Ravishing Princess Herzelinde, which also proved a huge cinema hit on its release in 2008.

The movie Kokowääh debuted in German cinemas in February 2011. Schweiger's daughter Emma stars beside him, and the movie is also directed, co-written and produced by him. Schweiger and Emma reprised their roles as Henry and Magdalena, respectively, in its sequel, titled Kokowääh 2. The film was released on 7 February 2013. In 2012 Schweiger made a film alongside his daughter Luna named Schutzengel. In 2013 Schweiger also started to produce commercials with his daughters.(Watchever, VHV Group)

Onscreen, Schweiger first appeared as an actor in 1989 in the TV series "Lindenstraße". His first film role came in 1991 with Manta, Manta. Additional TV and film roles followed, including Der bewegte Mann (Maybe, Maybe Not), Männerpension (Jailbirds), Das Mädchen Rosemarie (A Girl Called Rosemary), Bastard (Bandyta), Der große Bagarozy (The Devil and Ms. D.), Was tun, wenn's brennt (What to Do in Case of Fire?), Les Daltons vs. Lucky Luke, The Red Baron, Wo ist Fred (Where is Fred?), Phantomschmerz (Phantom Pain), Männerherzen (Men in the City), and others.

Schweiger has also appeared as a supporting actor in American films, including Already Dead, King Arthur, In Enemy Hands, Magicians, Lara Croft: Tomb Raider – The Cradle of Life, Driven, SLC Punk!, Investigating Sex, Joe and Max, The Replacement Killers and New Year's Eve. He wore a Nazi uniform for the first time in his career for his role in Inglourious Basterds but, as Quentin Tarantino revealed, "only because his character was killing Nazis."

Schweiger then appeared in the US productions The Courier with Mickey Rourke, This Means War (2012), with Chris Pine and Reese Witherspoon and more recently in 2013 as Darko in The Necessary Death of Charlie Countryman with Shia LaBeouf among others. He also made an appearance in 2014's Muppets Most Wanted. His latest big screen appearance was in David Leitch's Atomic Blonde.

Personal life 
Schweiger married American model Dana Carlsen on 19 June 1995. They have four children: Valentin Florian Schweiger (born 1995), Luna Marie Schweiger (born 1997), Lilli Camille Schweiger (born 1998), and Emma Tiger Schweiger (born 2002). Schweiger and Carlsen separated in 2005 and were divorced in 2014.

Schweiger lives in Mallorca, Spain, and his neighbour is German former cyclist Jan Ullrich. In August 2018, Ullrich was arrested for allegedly breaking onto Schweiger's property and threatening him.

Filmography

Film

Television

Awards 

 1994: Bambi für Der bewegte Mann
 1995: Bambi für Jailbirds
 1997: Preis des Gdynia Film Festival für Bastard als bester Darsteller
 1998: Bravo Otto als bester Schauspieler
 1998: Goldene Kamera für Knockin' on Heaven's Door als bester Schauspieler
 2003: Hessischer Kulturpreis
 2008: Jupiter für Wo ist Fred? als bester deutscher Schauspieler
 2008: Ehren-Bravo Otto
 2008: Bambi für Keinohrhasen als Film National
 2008: Deutscher Comedypreis für Keinohrhasen als beste Kino-Komödie
 2009: Jupiter für Keinohrhasen
 2009: 2x DIVA-Award für Keinohrhasen
 2010: Deutscher Comedypreis für Zweiohrküken als beste Kino-Komödie
 2011: Deutscher Comedypreis für die erfolgreichste deutsche Filmkomödie: Kokowääh
 2011: Querdenker-Award
 2012: Jupiter für Kokowääh als bester Darsteller
 2013: Deutscher Comedypreis für die erfolgreichste deutsche Filmkomödie: Kokowääh 2
 2015: Romy in den Kategorien beste Regie sowie bester Produzent Kinofilm für Honig im Kopf
 2015: Deutscher Filmpreis in der Kategorie Besucherstärkster Film für Honig im Kopf
 2015: CIVIS-Publikumspreis für Honig im Kopf
 2015: Deutscher Comedypreis für die erfolgreichste deutsche Filmkomödie: Honig im Kopf
 2015: Bambi für Honig im Kopf in der Kategorie „Ehrenpreis der Jury"
 2020: Golden Eye Award des Zurich Film Festival

References

External links 

Photographs and bibliography
Til Schweiger in the German Dubbing Card Index

1963 births
Living people
Actors from Freiburg im Breisgau
German male film actors
Film people from Freiburg im Breisgau
German male television actors
Outstanding Performance by a Cast in a Motion Picture Screen Actors Guild Award winners
20th-century German male actors
21st-century German male actors
German emigrants to Spain